A Doll's House is a 1918 American silent drama film produced by Famous Players-Lasky and distributed by Artcraft Pictures, an affiliate of Paramount Pictures. It is the third American motion picture filming of Henrik Ibsen's 1879 play A Doll's House.  Maurice Tourneur directed and Elsie Ferguson starred. This film is lost.

Plot
As described in a film magazine, to save her husband's life Nora Helmar (Ferguson) borrows a large sum of money and, after he has recovered, saying nothing to him, she slowly pays the debt. When Helmar (Herbert) discharges Krogstadt (Shannon), the moneylender, from the bank, Krogstadt threatens to expose Nora's act. Believing that her husband will condone what she has done, Nora confesses. Instead, he blames her. This unexpected action changes the doll-wife into a woman of the world, and as such she leaves her husband and three children to go out into the world and apply her knowledge of the serious side of life for her further education.

Cast
Elsie Ferguson as Nora Helmar
Holmes Herbert as Thorvald Helmar
Alex Shannon as Krogstadt
Ethel Grey Terry as Mrs. Linden
Warren Cook as Dr. Rank
Zelda Crosby as Ellen, the Maid
Mrs. R.S. Anderson as Anna, the Nurse
Ivy Ward as Helmar Child
Tula Belle as Helmar Child
Douglas Redmond as Krogstadt Child
Charles Crompton as Krogstadt Child

References

External links

1918 films
American silent feature films
American films based on plays
Films based on A Doll's House
Films directed by Maurice Tourneur
Lost American films
Famous Players-Lasky films
1918 drama films
Silent American drama films
American black-and-white films
1918 lost films
Lost drama films
1910s American films
1910s English-language films